Kim Young-kwang (born 1983) is a South Korean football player.

Kim Young-kwang may also refer to:

Kim Young-kwang (actor) (born 1987)
Kim Young-kwang (footballer born 1987)